Fredrik Ullén (born 1968) is a Swedish pianist. He has made recordings for the BIS, BMG Classics, Caprice, Danacord, dbProductions, and Phono Suecia labels.

Born in 1968 in Västerås, Ullén studied at the Royal College of Music, Stockholm, where his teachers included Gunnar Hallhagen and Irène Mannheimer.  Later studies at the Sibelius Academy in Helsinki included work with Liisa Pohjola.

His recordings include a collection of Chopin transcriptions and György Ligeti's complete works for piano. In 1996, he became the first person to record the second book of Ligeti's Études. Ullén has also produced the first complete recording of Kaikhosru Shapurji Sorabji's 8½-hour cycle of 100 Transcendental Studies.

In addition to his career as a performer, he is involved in scientific research on music and the brain. Since 2010, he has been Professor of Cognitive Neuroscience at Karolinska Institutet.

References

External links 
 Ullén's homepage

People from Västerås
1968 births
Living people
Swedish classical pianists
Male classical pianists
Academic staff of the Karolinska Institute
21st-century classical pianists
21st-century Swedish male musicians